The Rise may refer to:
 The Rise (band), a five-piece American rock band
 The Rise (Futuristic album), 2015
 The Rise (Carl Riseley album), 2008
 The Rise (DJ Sammy album), 2005
"The Rise", a 2012 song by Charlotte Church from One
 The Rise (film), a 2012 British crime film
Pushpa: The Rise, a 2021 Indian film